John Parker (c.1651 – in or after 1719) was an English army officer and Jacobite conspirator.

Life
His father William Parker was excise commissioner in 1652–3, and later a physician at Margate; his mother was Judith, daughter of Roger Beckwith of Aldborough, Yorkshire. Their first known ancestor was John Parker, Master of the Rolls in Ireland (died 1564), a native of Tenterden in Kent, who went to Ireland about 1540 and became both a senior judge and a substantial landowner in that country.

In 1676 he was appointed captain of a company in the Duke of Monmouth's regiment in France, and in 1678 he became captain in James, Duke of York's regiment. In 1681 he was brigadier-lieutenant, in 1683 lieutenant in the Guards, in 1685 captain of horse; later in that year he was major of Lord Arran's cavalry regiment, and in 1687 lieutenant-colonel.

Parker followed James II into exile at St. Germain, and to Ireland where he served with James' Jacobite Irish Army. He was wounded at the Battle of the Boyne in 1690, where his troop of cavalry sustained heavy losses.

Arrested in London in 1693 as a party to an assassination plot against William III, planned to take place in Flanders, Parker escaped. In May 1694 he was again taken, in Bloomsbury, and sent to the Tower of London, where he was kept in close confinement, and denied writing materials. He had been implicated in the Sieur de Grandval's confession, and in June 1694 a true bill was found against him, but the trial was postponed. On 11 August, Sir John Friend having bribed a warder, Parker escaped, and a reward was offered for his apprehension.

In the aftermath of the Jacobite assassination plot 1696, Parker was repeatedly mentioned in the trials of Robert Charnock and Friend. In October 1696 he accompanied the Duke of Berwick to London. Berwick contacted his mother Arabella Churchill, who informed on Parker, who had to flee to France.

In 1702 Louis XIV ordered the arrest of Parker, who by unguarded talk had annoyed Mary of Modena and her favourite Charles Middleton, 2nd Earl of Middleton. He was confined in the Bastille from 16 August 1702 till June 1704. On his release, he was forbidden to visit St. Germain. He made offers to change sides via Caillaud, an agent of the English government. He was back in favour in 1708, and is thought to have died after his correspondence with William Dicconson ceased, in 1719.

Family
Parker was married twice. By his first wife Johanna Rouse, he had two sons, Gervais Parker and Christopher. They did not follow him into exile, but attained high ranks in the British army and navy.

Notes

Attribution

1651 births
1719 deaths
English Jacobites
English army officers